James Kennedy (13 January 1797 – 25 September 1886) was a Scottish locomotive and marine engineer. He was born in the village of Gilmerton near Edinburgh, Scotland.

Career

Early years
He was apprenticed at the age of 13 to a millwright near Dalkeith, where he remained for five years.  He spent some years working as a millwright, working with winding and pumping engines at several places before moving to Laverock Hall (now Larkhall) near Hamilton, where he was employed to erect pumping and winding engines of his own design.

Robert Stephenson and Company
In Liverpool to supervise the installation of a marine engine, he met George Stephenson, who was then establishing his locomotive works, Robert Stephenson and Company, at Newcastle-upon-Tyne. Stephenson appointed Kennedy manager in 1824. While in this post, Kennedy constructed two pairs of stationary winding engines and planned the first three locomotives for the opening of the Stockton and Darlington Railway in 1825.

Bury, Curtis and Kennedy
In 1825 he left Stephenson to return to Liverpool as manager of Mather, Dixon and Company but very soon joined locomotive builder Edward Bury and Company as foreman of the Clarence Foundry. In 1842 he became a partner in the firm, now renamed Bury, Curtis and Kennedy.

Thomas Vernon and Son
From 1844 he also acted as manager of the Liverpool shipbuilder Thomas Vernon and Son where he introduced iron deck beams.

Professional appointments
He was a founder member of the Institution of Mechanical Engineers in 1847, becoming its President in 1860.

Death
He died in 1886 at his home, Cressington Park, Garston, near Liverpool. He was survived by his wife, Adelaide.

References

1797 births
1886 deaths
19th-century Scottish people
People of the Industrial Revolution
Scottish inventors
British steam engine engineers
Scottish railway mechanical engineers
British railway pioneers
Locomotive builders and designers
People from Garston
Engineers from Liverpool